Dunwoody is a train station in Dunwoody, Georgia, on the Red Line of the Metropolitan Atlanta Rapid Transit Authority (MARTA) rail system. It is located at the southwest corner of Perimeter Mall, and also serves the surrounding high-rise office parks in the Perimeter Center business district. From 1996 to 2000, it was the terminus of the old North Line.

The station serves Dunwoody as well as commuters from surrounding north DeKalb and Fulton counties. The Sandy Springs city limit is just 300 meters/1,000 feet west at the county line. It is the only Red Line station in DeKalb County, as the line (which otherwise runs in Fulton County, just west of the due north/south county line) swings east for this station.

Station layout

Parking
Dunwoody has 1,048 daily and long term parking spaces available for MARTA users which are located in two parking decks.

Nearby landmarks and popular destinations
Perimeter Mall
 Cox Communications
 Central Perimeter Business District

Special bus routes
In the mornings, MARTA provides a direct bus Route toward North Springs High School via Route 87.

Bus routes
The station is served by the following MARTA bus routes:
 Route 5 - Piedmont Road / Sandy Springs
 Route 87 - Roswell Road / Morgan Falls
 Route 150 - Perimeter Center / Dunwoody Village

References

External links
MARTA Station Page
nycsubway.org Atlanta page
 Hammond Drive entrance from Google Maps Street View

Red Line (MARTA)
Railway stations in the United States opened in 1996
Metropolitan Atlanta Rapid Transit Authority stations
Railway stations in DeKalb County, Georgia
1996 establishments in Georgia (U.S. state)